NA-26 Mohmand is a constituency for the National Assembly of Pakistan comprising Mohmand District of Khyber Pakhtunkhwa province. It was renumbered from NA-36 to NA-43 in the 2018 to NA-26 in the 2022 delimitations.

Members of Parliament

2002–2018: NA-36 Tribal Area I

Since 2018: NA-43 Tribal Area-IV

Election 2002 

General elections were held on 10 Oct 2002. Maulana Ghulam Muhammad Sadiq an Independent candidate won by 16,358 votes.

Election 2008 

The result of general election 2008 in this constituency is given below.

Result 
Bilal Rehman succeeded in the election 2008 and became the member of National Assembly.

Election 2013 

General elections were held on 11 May 2013. Bilal Rehman an Independent candidate won by 9,005 votes and became the  member of National Assembly.

Election 2018 

General elections were held on 25 July 2018.

By-election 2023 
A by-election will be held on 19 March 2023 due to the resignation of Sajid Khan Mohmand, the previous MNA from this seat.

See also
NA-25 Charsadda-II
NA-27 Khyber

References

External links 
 Election result's official website

42
42